Jodie Rogers (born 17 May 1970) is an Australian diver.

Rogers competed in the 1996 Summer Olympics in Atlanta where she came 15th in the women's 3m springboard event. She also competed in the 1994 Commonwealth Games where she won a silver medal in the 1m springboard event and a bronze medal in the 3m springboard event.

References

1970 births
Living people
Divers from Melbourne
Olympic divers of Australia
Australian female divers
Divers at the 1996 Summer Olympics
Divers at the 1994 Commonwealth Games
Commonwealth Games silver medallists for Australia
Commonwealth Games bronze medallists for Australia
Commonwealth Games medallists in diving
20th-century Australian women
21st-century Australian women
Medallists at the 1994 Commonwealth Games